Esteban Javier Pipino (born 19 April 1990) is an Argentine professional footballer who plays as a midfielder for Deportes Copiapó.

Career
Pipino began with Tigre's youth, before joining Fénix. He featured in thirteen fixtures and netted three goals in 2011–12, as the club won promotion from Primera D Metropolitana to Primera C Metropolitana. A further nineteen appearances came in 2012–13 as they secured a second successive promotion to Primera B Metropolitana. In 2013, Pipino moved to Austrian football with fifth tier SV Eltendorf. He'd score sixteen goals in thirty-seven fixtures in 2. Liga Süd; whilst netting nine in five for their reserves. His final goal came on 14 June 2014 versus USV Rudersdorf, which preceded a departure in November after contract issues.

Pipino, in 2015, played for Torneo Federal B outfit Atlético Pilar Obrero. 2016 saw Pipino completed a move to Acassuso. His opening goal came in a win away to Deportivo Español in May, before he scored sixteen times in three seasons; which included a hat-trick over Platense on 17 February 2018. On 9 June 2019, Pipino agreed terms with newly-promoted Primera B Nacional team Deportivo Riestra. Six months later, Pipino headed to Chile with Deportes Copiapó.

Career statistics
.

References

External links

1990 births
Living people
People from Tigre, Buenos Aires
Argentine footballers
Association football midfielders
Argentine expatriate footballers
Expatriate footballers in Austria
Expatriate footballers in Chile
Argentine expatriate sportspeople in Austria
Argentine expatriate sportspeople in Chile
Primera D Metropolitana players
Primera C Metropolitana players
Austrian 2. Landesliga players
Primera B Metropolitana players
Primera Nacional players
Primera B de Chile players
Club Atlético Fénix players
Club Atlético Acassuso footballers
Deportivo Riestra players
Deportes Copiapó footballers
Sportspeople from Buenos Aires Province